Algeria competed in the 2008 Summer Olympics, held in Beijing, People's Republic of China, from 8 to 24 August 2008.

Medalists

| width="100%" align="left" valign="top" |

| width="30%" align="left" valign="top" |

Athletics 

Men
Track & road events

Field events

Women
Track & road events

Field events

Badminton

Boxing

Algeria qualified eight boxers for the Olympic boxing tournament. All eight qualified at the 1st AIBA African Olympic Boxing Qualifying Tournament.

Cycling

Road

Fencing

Women

Judo 

Men

Women

Rowing 

Men

Qualification Legend: FA=Final A (medal); FB=Final B (non-medal); FC=Final C (non-medal); FD=Final D (non-medal); FE=Final E (non-medal); FF=Final F (non-medal); SA/B=Semifinals A/B; SC/D=Semifinals C/D; SE/F=Semifinals E/F; QF=Quarterfinals; R=Repechage

Swimming 

Men

Table tennis

Volleyball

Women's indoor tournament
Algeria entered a team in the women's tournament. The team lost all five matches in the group play, and finished last in their group. The team's final ranking was tied for 11th place.

Roster

Group play

Weightlifting

Wrestling 

Men's Greco-Roman

See also
 Algeria at the 2008 Summer Paralympics

References

Nations at the 2008 Summer Olympics
2008
Summer Olympics